The fourteenth season of Supernatural, an American dark fantasy television series created by Eric Kripke, premiered on October 11, 2018, on The CW, and concluded on April 25, 2019. The season consists of 20 episodes and aired on Thursdays at 8:00 pm (ET). This is the third season with Andrew Dabb and Robert Singer as showrunners.

The thirteenth episode of the season marks the 300th episode of the series. The season follows Sam and Dean who, along with Jack and Castiel, try to take down the archangel Michael from another world, and learn something bigger is at hand.

Cast

Starring
 Jared Padalecki as Sam Winchester
 Jensen Ackles as Dean Winchester / Michael
 Mark Pellegrino as Nick / Lucifer
 Alexander Calvert as Jack Kline
 Misha Collins as Castiel

Special guest stars
 Jim Beaver as Bobby Singer
 DJ Qualls as Garth Fitzgerald IV
 Jeffrey Dean Morgan as John Winchester

Guest stars

Episodes

Production
On April 2, 2018, The CW renewed the series for a fourteenth season. In June, it was revealed that the fourteenth season would contain only 20 episodes, the series' shortest season since the third season which was only 16 episodes due to the 2007–08 Writers Guild of America strike. Filming for the season began on July 10, 2018, and concluded on March 26, 2019. With Lucifer having been killed at the end of the thirteenth season, actor Mark Pellegrino instead portrayed the role of Nick, Lucifer's former vessel.

Reception
The review aggregator website Rotten Tomatoes reports an 82% approval rating for Supernatural's fourteenth season, with an average rating of 7.5/10 based on 11 reviews. The site's critics consensus reads, "Supernatural remains engrossing despite its almost spooky longevity, patiently doling out new paranormal challenges in a season that takes the time to reflect on a seismic shift amongst the ensemble's dynamics."

Ratings

Notes

References

External links

Supernatural 14
2018 American television seasons
2019 American television seasons